George Ballard may refer to:
 George Ballard (biographer) (1706–1755), English antiquary and writer
 George Alexander Ballard (1862–1948), British naval officer and historian
 Butch Ballard (George Edward Ballard, 1918–2011), American jazz drummer

See also